Nocticanace is a genus of beach flies in the family Canacidae. All known species are Oriental, Neotropical  or Australasian.

Species

N. actites Mathis & Wirth, 1979
N. arnaudi Wirth, 1954
N. ashlocki Wirth, 1969
N. caffraria (Cresson, 1934)
N. cancer Wirth, 1969
N. chilensis (Cresson, 1931)
N. curioi Wirth, 1969
N. cyclura Mathis & Wirth, 1979
N. danjoensis Miyagi, 1973
N. danvini Wirth, 1969
N. flavipalpis Mathis & Wirth, 1979
N. galapagensis (Curran, 1934)
N. hachijuoensis Miyagi, 1965
N. japonicus Miyagi, 1965
N. litoralis Delfinado, 1971
N. littorea Mathis & Freidberg, 1991
N. mahensis (Lamb, 1912)
N. malayensis Miyagi, 1973
N. marshallensis Wirth, 1951
N. paciftcus Sasakawa, 1955
N. panamensis Mathis, 1989
N. peculiaris Malloch, 1933
N. propristyla Miyagi, 1973
N. scapanius Wirth, 1969
N. sinaiensis Mathis, 1982
N. sinensis Delfinado, 1971
N. spinicosta Wirth, 1969
N. takagii Miyagi, 1965
N. taprobane Mathis, 1982
N. texensis (Wheeler, 1952)
N. usingeri Wirth, 1969
N. wirthi Mathis, 1989
N. zimmermani Wirth, 1951

References

Canacidae
Carnoidea genera